The white-browed rosefinch has been split into two species:

 Himalayan white-browed rosefinch (Carpodacus thura)
 Chinese white-browed rosefinch (Carpodacus dubius)